The Christian Jipp Home & Grocery  is a historic building located in the Hamburg Historic District in Davenport, Iowa, United States.  The district was added to the National Register of Historic Places in 1983.  The house and grocery was individually listed on the Davenport Register of Historic Properties in 2005.

History
The grocery store was completed in 1868 by Christian Jipp, an immigrant from present-day Germany.  It was one of the first retail buildings that was built on the bluff in Davenport.  Jipp, his wife and three daughters lived in the back of the store until the house was added in 1878.  He operated the store until 1906 and the store itself remained open until 1958 when it was converted into a laundromat and the house became a rental property.  The building had been vacate for 20 years and was slated by the city for demolition in 2004 when the Gateway Redevelopment Group received private and public funds to stabilize the structure and then to renovate it.  The building now serves as the Architectural Rescue Shop, which collects, restores, preserves and sells old architectural items.  There is also an apartment on the second floor of the structure.

References

Historic district contributing properties in Iowa
Commercial buildings completed in 1868
Houses completed in 1878
Buildings and structures in Davenport, Iowa
Davenport Register of Historic Properties
National Register of Historic Places in Davenport, Iowa
Commercial buildings on the National Register of Historic Places in Iowa
Houses on the National Register of Historic Places in Iowa
Grocery store buildings